"Do You Remember?" is a song written by Brian Wilson and Mike Love for the American rock band the Beach Boys, released on their 1964 album All Summer Long. The song is a minor rewrite of "The Big Beat", an earlier composition Wilson had written for Bob & Sheri in 1963. Both songs are tributes to 1950s rock and roll, referencing performers such as Buddy Holly and Hank Ballard.

Composition
"Do You Remember?" was originally credited to just Brian Wilson. Mike Love's name was added as a result of a lawsuit filed by him against Wilson in the 1990s.

Byron Preiss called the song a "fractured history lesson". Musicologist Philip Lambert writes: "Mike and Brian's 'Do You Remember?' frankly commands us to make these connections, in the form of a rock-and-roll history lesson and demonstration. While mentioning key historical figures—Little Richard, Chuck Berry, and Elvis—they remind us of rock and roll as a cultural phenomenon, because 'the critics kept aknockin' but the stars kept a-rockin'."

Recording
"Do You Remember?" was recorded on May 6 and 18, 1964 at United Western Recorders.

References

1964 songs
The Beach Boys songs
Songs written by Brian Wilson
Songs written by Mike Love
Song recordings produced by Brian Wilson
Songs about nostalgia
Songs about rock music
Songs about musicians
Songs about Buddy Holly
Songs about Elvis Presley
Cultural depictions of rock musicians